Robyn Leggatt  (7 May 1957) is an Australian field hockey player. She competed in the women's tournament at the 1984 Summer Olympics.

She received the Order of Australia in 2011 and was inducted into the NSW Hockey Hall of Fame in 2007.

References

External links
 

1957 births
Living people
Australian female field hockey players
Olympic field hockey players of Australia
Field hockey players at the 1984 Summer Olympics
Place of birth missing (living people)